RV Investigator is an Australian marine research vessel which was designed by RALion (joint venture between Robert Allan Ltd. and Alion Science and Technology). It was constructed in Singapore and is owned and managed by the Commonwealth Scientific and Industrial Research Organisation (CSIRO), through Australia's Marine National Facility, with its operations funded by the Australian Government to undertake oceanographic, geoscience, ecosystem and fisheries research.  In May 2009 the Australian Government allocated A$120 million for a new ocean-going research vessel to replace the 1972 built RV Southern Surveyor, which has served as the principal research ship for Australia's Marine National Facility since 1988. RV Investigator was transferred from Sembawang Shipyard to the delivery crew on 5 August 2014 for pre-departure testing and setup. The vessel arrived at its home port of Hobart on 9 September 2014 and was officially launched on 12 December 2014.

Specifications  
The RV Investigator is able to accommodate up to 40 scientists, go to sea for up to 60 days at a time and spend up to 300 days of the year at sea on research voyages. Operating costs are estimated to be $140,000 per day. Special features of the ship are a "gondola", similar to a winged keel, mounted 1.2 m below the hull, and two drop keels (which can be lowered to a maximum of 4m below the hull), to carry scientific instruments below the layer of microbubbles created by the movement of the ship’s hull through the water.  Such instrumentation includes acoustic mappers, a pelagic sediment profiler to produce maps of the sea floor, and 2 Acoustic Doppler current profilers.  The hull and the machinery of the ship have been designed to operate as quietly as possible to enhance its scientific capabilities.

Notable works 
In November 2020, the RV Investigator front camera captured a green meteor entering the atmosphere and produces a clear video of this rare phenomenon.  The meteor footage was captured in the southern coast of Tasmania.

References

External links 
 

Research vessels of Australia
2013 ships
CSIRO